The 1919 Virginia Orange and Blue football team represented the University of Virginia as a member of the South Atlantic Intercollegiate Athletic Association (SAIAA) during the 1919 college football season. Led by Harris Coleman in his first and only season as head coach, the Orange and Blue compiled an overall record of 2–5–2 with a mark of 1–1–1 in conference play, tying for seventh place in the SAIAA.

Schedule

References

Virginia
Virginia Cavaliers football seasons
Virginia Orange and Blue football